is the 8th single by Nogizaka46. It was released on April 2, 2014. It debuted in number one on the weekly Oricon Singles Chart. It's the 6th best-selling single of the year, as of June 18. It has sold a total of 546,369 copies, as of August 11. It reached number one on the Billboard Japan Hot 100. It was the 10th best-selling single of the year in Japan, with 546,832 copies.

Release 
This single was released in 4 versions. Type-A, Type-B, Type-C and a regular edition. The center position in the choreography for the title song is held by Nanase Nishino.

Track listing

Type-A

Type-B

Type-C

Regular Edition

Chart and certifications

Weekly charts

Year-end charts

Certifications

References

Further reading

External links
 Discography  on Nogizaka46 Official Website 
 
 Nogizaka46 Movie Digest on YouTube

2014 singles
2014 songs
Japanese-language songs
Nogizaka46 songs
Oricon Weekly number-one singles
Billboard Japan Hot 100 number-one singles
Songs with lyrics by Yasushi Akimoto